Moraine Music Group is one of Nashville's leading independent publishers, with a reputation for unique songs that result in career-making hit singles.  For a relatively small company, Moraine's songs have appeared on numerous multi-million selling albums spanning various genres of music. Moraine has received over 50 music publishing awards, including 1998 SESAC Publisher of the Year and numerous Canadian Country Music Association Awards for Song, Single, Video and Album of the Year.  Moraine’s songs and artists have been included in feature films, television shows, and advertisements including Gareth Dunlop and SHEL's "Hold On" in The Best of Me, SHEL's "I Was Born A Dreamer" in a Toys R Us Christmas advertisement, and Gareth Dunlop's "Devil Like You" in Lucifer. 

The company's songs are featured on releases by Taylor Swift, Kelly Clarkson, Trisha Yearwood, Wynonna, Tim McGraw, Alan Jackson, Lee Ann Womack, Garth Brooks, Gary Allan, Pat Green, Sister Hazel, Blackhawk, Lee Roy Parnell, Kenny Rogers and many others.

Notable writers

Current
 Gareth Dunlop
 Kim Richey 
 Brent Maher
 SHEL

Past
 Billy Montana
 Johnny Reid

Selected charting singles

Number one songs

References

 Moraine Records Launches August 12, 2004 Billboard.com
 Keni Thomas Waves 'Flag' January 19, 2005 Billboard.com

External links
 

Music production companies
Music publishing companies of the United States
Companies based in Tennessee